The 2017–18 Ligat Nashim was the 20th season of women's league football under the Israeli Football Association. League schedule began on 31 October 2017. The defending champions are F.C. Kiryat Gat, having won the title the previous season.

In the premier league, F.C. Kiryat Gat won its first championship while Hapoel Petah Tikva relegated. Hapoel Be'er Sheva won Women's Liga Leumit and was promoted to the top division.

Premier League

Results

Matches 1–22

Matches 19–28

Positions by round
The table lists the positions of teams after each week of matches. Note that Championship round teams will play in 28 matchdays, and the Relegation round teams will compete in only 24 matches.

Top scorers

Leumit League

Results

Matches 1–14

Matches 15–20

Positions by round
The table lists the positions of teams after each week of matches. Note that Top Playoff teams will play in 20 matchdays, and the Bottom Playoff teams will compete in only 17 matches.

Test Match

Bnot Netanya remained in the Premier League; Bnot Eilat remained in Leumit League.

References

External links
Ligat Nashim Rishona @IFA
Ligat Nashim Shniya @IFA

Ligat Nashim seasons
1
women
Israel